All My Love is the fourteenth studio album by American singer Peabo Bryson. It was released by Capitol Records in May 1989 in the United States. The album marked Bryson's first release with the label after four years with Elektra Records.

Critical reception

AllMusic reviewer Ron Wynn called All My Love "immediate and satisfying. This album was not only one of his strongest in many years, but such songs as "Show and Tell" and "Palm of Your Hand" got widespread urban contemporary airplay, and D'atra Hicks got a career boost from doing a duet with Bryson on the album."

Track listing

Personnel and credits 
Musicians

 Peabo Bryson – lead vocals, rhythm arrangements (2, 3, 6, 10), BGV arrangements (8, 9, 10), electric piano (9), keyboards (10), synthesizers (10)
 Dean Gant – synthesizers (1, 2, 3, 5, 6), Synclavier (1, 2, 3, 5-10), drums (1, 2, 3, 5, 6, 8, 9), percussion (1, 2, 3, 5, 6, 8, 9), rhythm arrangements (1, 3, 5, 7, 8, 9), synthesizer arrangements (2, 5), string arrangements (2, 5, 9), acoustic piano (3, 5, 6), BGV arrangements (5)
 Randy Cantor – keyboards (4), drums (4)
 Odeen Mays – keyboards (4), drums (4), vibraphone solo (4)
 Rick Sheppard – additional programming (6, 10)
 Paul Jackson Jr. – lead guitar (1, 2, 3, 5-10)
 Randy Bowland – lead guitar (4)
 Leon "Ndugu" Chancler – drum overdubs (1-9) cymbal overdubs (1-9)
 Marc Freeman – drum overdubs (10) cymbal overdubs (10)
 Gerald Albright – saxophone solo (1-7, 10)
 Larry Jackson – saxophone solo (8, 9)
 Dwight W. Watkins – rhythm arrangements (2, 5, 6, 8, 9, 10), electric piano (6), BGV arrangements (8, 9, 10), additional programming (10), percussion (10)
 Curt Dowd – arrangements (4)
 Nick Martinelli – arrangements (4)
 Jim Salamone – arrangements (4)
 Alex Brown – backing vocals (1, 2, 3, 5-10), BGV arrangements (1, 2, 3, 7, 8, 9)
 Carl Caldwell – backing vocals (1, 2, 3, 5-10)
 Alice Echols – backing vocals (1, 2, 3, 5-10)
 Angel Edwards – backing vocals (1, 2, 3, 5-10)
 Josie James – backing vocals (1, 2, 3, 5-10)
 Marlena Jeter – backing vocals (1, 2, 3, 5-10)
 Marva King – backing vocals (1, 2, 3, 5-10)
 D'atra Hicks – lead vocals (4)
 Regina Belle – backing vocals (4)
 Cynthia Biggs – backing vocals (4)
 Chris Walker – backing vocals (4)
 Steve Wise – backing vocals (4)
 Jasmine Guy – lead vocals (10)

Production

 Step Johnson – executive producer 
 Tom Vickers – executive producer
 Thom Kidd – recording (1, 2, 3, 5-10), mixing (1, 2, 3, 5-10)
 Bruce Weedon – recording (4), mixing (4)
 Gregg Barrett – additional recording (1, 2, 3, 5-10)
 Craig Burbidge – additional recording (1, 2, 3, 5-10)
 Rob Siefert – additional recording (1, 2, 3, 5-10)
 Tom Pee – recording assistant (1, 2, 3, 5-10)
 Peabo Bryson – mixing (1, 2, 3, 5-10)
 Dean Gant – mixing (1, 2, 3, 5-10)
 Dwight W. Watkins – mixing (1, 2, 3, 5-10)
 Carol Friedman – art direction, photography 
 Amy Dakos – design 
 John Kosh – design
 David M. Franklin – management

Studios

 Recorded at Cheshire Sound Studios (Atlanta, Georgia); Sigma Sound Studios (Philadelphia, Pennsylvania); Aire L.A. Studios (Glendale, California).
 Mixed at Cheshire Sound Studios and Sigma Sound Studios.

Charts

References 

1989 albums
Peabo Bryson albums